The 2021–22 Utah Jazz season was the 48th season of the franchise in the National Basketball Association (NBA), and the 43rd season of the franchise in Salt Lake City.

After a win against the Memphis Grizzlies in overtime on April 5, the Jazz clinched their sixth consecutive playoff appearance. The Jazz would play the Dallas Mavericks in the first round of the 2022 NBA playoffs where they lost the series in six games.

Draft picks

Roster

Standings

Division

Conference

Game log

Preseason 

|-style="background:#fcc;"
| 1
| October 4
| @ San Antonio
| 
| Jared Butler (16)
| Hassan Whiteside (10)
| Elijah Hughes (4)
| AT&T Center10,174
| 0–1
|-style="background:#fcc;"
| 2
| October 6
| @ Dallas
| 
| Jared Butler (22)
| Udoka Azubuike (14)
| Trent Forrest (6)
| American Airlines Center15,841
| 0–2
|-style="background:#cfc;"
| 3
| October 12
| @ New Orleans
| 
| Rudy Gobert (19)
| Rudy Gobert (19)
| Conley, Mitchell (5)
| Vivint Arena15,535
| 1–2
|-style="background:#cfc;"
| 4
| October 13
| Milwaukee
|  
| Jordan Clarkson (18)
| Jordan Clarkson (8)
| Jared Butler (7)
| Vivint Arena16,016
| 2–2

Regular season 

|-style="background:#cfc;"
| 1
| October 20
| Oklahoma City
| 
| Bojan Bogdanović (22)
| Rudy Gobert (21)
| Conley Jr., Mitchell (4)
| Vivint Arena18,306
| 1–0
|-style="background:#cfc;"
| 2
| October 22
| @ Sacramento
| 
| Donovan Mitchell (27)
| Rudy Gobert (20)
| Donovan Mitchell (4)
| Golden 1 Center17,583
| 2–0
|-style="background:#cfc;"
| 3
| October 26
| Denver
|  
| Rudy Gobert (23)
| Rudy Gobert (16)
| Donovan Mitchell (6)
| Vivint Arena18,306
| 3–0
|-style="background:#cfc;"
| 4
| October 28
| @ Houston
| 
| Clarkson, Gobert (16)
| Rudy Gobert (14)
| Donovan Mitchell (6)
| Toyota Center15,858
| 4–0
|-style="background:#fcc;"
| 5
| October 30
| @ Chicago
| 
| Donovan Mitchell (30)
| Rudy Gobert (19)
| Donovan Mitchell (6)
| United Center20,668
| 4–1
|-style="background:#cfc;"
| 6
| October 31
| @ Milwaukee
| 
| Donovan Mitchell (28)
| Rudy Gobert (13)
| Conley Jr., Gobert, Mitchell, O'Neale (2)
| Fiserv Forum17,341
| 5–1

|-style="background:#cfc;"
| 7
| November 2
| Sacramento
| 
| Donovan Mitchell (36)
| Rudy Gobert (20)
| Donovan Mitchell (6)
| Vivint Arena18,306
| 6–1
|-style="background:#cfc;"
| 8
| November 4
| @ Atlanta
| 
| Jordan Clarkson (30)
| Rudy Gobert (15)
| Mike Conley Jr. (11)
| State Farm Arena16,590
| 7–1
|-style="background:#fcc;"
| 9
| November 6
| @ Miami
| 
| Donovan Mitchell (37)
| Gobert, Whiteside (8)
| Conley Jr., Mitchell (7)
| FTX Arena19,600
| 7–2
|-style="background:#fcc;"
| 10
| November 7
| @ Orlando
| 
| Gobert, Mitchell (21)
| Rudy Gobert (15)
| Donovan Mitchell (7)
| Amway Center13,386
| 7–3
|-style="background:#cfc;"
| 11
| November 9
| Atlanta
| 
| Donovan Mitchell (27)
| Rudy Gobert (14)
| Mike Conley Jr. (6)
| Vivint Arena18,306
| 8–3
|-style="background:#fcc;"
| 12
| November 11
| Indiana
| 
| Donovan Mitchell (26)
| Rudy Gobert (11)
| Mike Conley Jr. (8)
| Vivint Arena18,306
| 8–4
|-style="background:#fcc;"
| 13
| November 13
| Miami
| 
| Bojan Bogdanović (26)
| Rudy Gobert (13)
| Mike Conley Jr. (8)
| Vivint Arena18,306
| 8–5
|-style="background:#cfc;"
| 14
| November 16
| Philadelphia
| 
| Bojan Bogdanović (27)
| Rudy Gobert (17)
| Conley Jr., Ingles (7)
| Vivint Arena18,306
| 9–5
|-style="background:#cfc;"
| 15
| November 18
| Toronto
| 
| Gay, Mitchell (20)
| Rudy Gobert (11)
| Joe Ingles (8)
| Vivint Arena18,306
| 10–5
|-style="background:#cfc;"
| 16
| November 20
| @ Sacramento
|  
| Donovan Mitchell (26)
| Rudy Gobert (14)
| Donovan Mitchell (5)
| Golden 1 Center13,180
| 11–5
|-style="background:#fcc;"
| 17
| November 22
| Memphis
| 
| Bojan Bogdanović (24)
| Rudy Gobert (13) 
| Conley, Mitchell (8)
| Vivint Arena18,306
| 11–6
|-style="background:#cfc;"
| 18
| November 24
| @ Oklahoma City
| 
| Jordan Clarkson (20)
| Rudy Gobert (17)
| Clarkson, Mitchell (5)
| Paycom Center14,081
| 12–6
|-style="background:#fcc;" 
| 19
| November 26
| New Orleans
| 
| Bojan Bogdanović (23)
| Rudy Gobert (10)
| Donovan Mitchell (6)
| Vivint Arena18,306
| 12–7
|-style="background:#cfc;"
| 20
| November 27
| New Orleans
| 
| Donovan Mitchell (21)
| Rudy Gobert (8)
| Donovan Mitchell (7)
| Vivint Arena18,306
| 13–7
|-style="background:#cfc;"
| 21
| November 29
| Portland
| 
| Donovan Mitchell (30)
| Rudy Gobert (16)
| Conley Jr., Ingles (6)
| Vivint Arena18,306
| 14–7

|-style="background:#cfc;"
| 22
| December 3
| Boston
| 
| Donovan Mitchell (34)
| Rudy Gobert (12)
| Mike Conley Jr. (7)
| Vivint Arena18,306
| 15–7
|-style="background:#cfc;"
| 23
| December 5
| @ Cleveland
| 
| Donovan Mitchell (35)
| Rudy Gobert (20)
| Conley Jr., Mitchell (6)
| Rocket Mortgage FieldHouse18,113
| 16–7
|-style="background:#cfc;"
| 24
| December 8
| @ Minnesota
| 
| Donovan Mitchell (36)
| Rudy Gobert (10)
| Ingles, O'Neale (6)
| Target Center15,181
| 17–7
|-style="background:#cfc;"
| 25
| December 9
| @ Philadelphia
| 
| Donovan Mitchell (22)
| Rudy Gobert (21)
| Joe Ingles (7)
| Wells Fargo Center20,272
| 18–7
|-style="background:#cfc;"
| 26
| December 11
| @ Washington
| 
| Donovan Mitchell (28)
| Hassan Whiteside (14)
| Mike Conley Jr. (8)
| Capital One Arena17,575
| 19–7
|-style="background:#cfc;"
| 27
| December 15
| L.A. Clippers
| 
| Donovan Mitchell (27)
| Rudy Gobert (17)
| Donovan Mitchell (6)
| Vivint Arena18,306
| 20–7
|-style="background:#fcc;"
| 28
| December 17
| San Antonio
| 
| Donovan Mitchell (27)
| Rudy Gobert (14)
| Mike Conley Jr. (6)
| Vivint Arena18,306
| 20–8
|-style="background:#fcc;"
| 29
| December 18
| Washington
| 
| Donovan Mitchell (32) 
| Rudy Gobert (19)
| Donovan Mitchell (5)
| Vivint Arena18,306
| 20–9 
|-style="background:#cfc;"
| 30
| December 20
| Charlotte
| 
| Bogdanović, Gobert (23)
| Rudy Gobert (21)
| Donovan Mitchell (6)
| Vivint Arena18,306
| 21–9
|-style="background:#cfc;"
| 31
| December 23
| Minnesota
| 
| Donovan Mitchell (28)
| Rudy Gobert (17)
| Clarkson, Mitchell (7)
| Vivint Arena18,306
| 22–9
|-style="background:#cfc;"
| 32
| December 25
| Dallas
| 
| Donovan Mitchell (33)
| Rudy Gobert (11)
| Joe Ingles (6)
| Vivint Arena18,306
| 23–9
|-style="background:#cfc;"
| 33
| December 27
| @ San Antonio
| 
| Jordan Clarkson (23)
| Rudy Gobert (13)
| Jordan Clarkson (5)
| AT&T Center16,255
| 24–9
|-style="background:#cfc;"
| 34
| December 29
| @ Portland
| 
| Rudy Gobert (22)
| Rudy Gobert (14)
| Mike Conley (6)
| Moda Center17,828
| 25–9
|-style="background:#cfc;"
| 35
| December 31
| Minnesota
| 
| Donovan Mitchell (39)
| Rudy Gobert (16)
| Donovan Mitchell (5)
| Vivint Arena18,306
| 26–9

|-style="background:#fcc;"
| 36
| January 1
| Golden State
| 
| Bogdanović, Clarkson, Gobert, Mitchell (20)
| Rudy Gobert (19)
| Donovan Mitchell (9)
| Vivint Arena18,306
| 26–10
|-style="background:#cfc;"
| 37
| January 3
| @ New Orleans
| 
| Donovan Mitchell (29)
| Rudy Gobert (17)
| Mike Conley (7)
| Smoothie King Center15,057
| 27–10
|-style="background:#cfc;"
| 38
| January 5
| @ Denver
| 
| Bojan Bogdanović (36)
| Bojan Bogdanović (13)
| Mike Conley (6)
| Ball Arena14,056
| 28–10
|-style="background:#fcc;"
| 39
| January 7
| @ Toronto
| 
| Eric Paschall (29)
| Elijah Hughes (8)
| Trent Forrest (8)
| Scotiabank Arena0
| 28–11
|-style="background:#fcc;"
| 40
| January 8
| @ Indiana
| 
| Donovan Mitchell (36)
| Hassan Whiteside (8)
| Donovan Mitchell (9)
| Gainbridge Fieldhouse13,160
| 28–12
|-style="background:#fcc;"
| 41
| January 10
| @ Detroit
| 
| Donovan Mitchell (31)
| Hassan Whiteside (14)
| Mike Conley (8)
| Little Caesars Arena17,834
| 28–13
|-style="background:#fcc;"
| 42
| January 12
| Cleveland
| 
| Jordan Clarkson (22)
| Royce O'Neale (9)
| Donovan Mitchell (4)
| Vivint Arena18,306
| 28–14
|-style="background:#cfc;"
| 43
| January 16
| @ Denver
| 
| Donovan Mitchell (31)
| Rudy Gobert (19)
| Mike Conley (6)
| Ball Arena15,647
| 29–14
|-style="background:#fcc;"
| 44
| January 17
| @ L.A. Lakers
| 
| Mike Conley (20)
| Rudy Gobert (16)
| Donovan Mitchell (7)
| Staples Center17,238
| 29–15
|-style="background:#fcc;"
| 45
| January 19
| Houston
| 
| Bojan Bogdanović (29)
| Joe Ingles (6)
| Royce O'Neale (15)
| Vivint Arena18,306
| 29–16
|-style="background:#cfc;"
| 46
| January 21
| Detroit
| 
| Rudy Gobert (24)
| Rudy Gobert (14)
| Joe Ingles (5)
| Vivint Arena18,306
| 30–16
|-style="background:#fcc;"
| 47
| January 23
| @ Golden State
| 
| Bojan Bogdanović (21)
| Rudy Gobert (18)
| Joe Ingles (5)
| Chase Center18,064
| 30–17
|-style="background:#fcc;"
| 48
| January 24
| @ Phoenix
|  
| Jordan Clarkson (22)
| Hassan Whiteside (9)
| Jordan Clarkson (5)
| Footprint Center17,071
| 30–18
|-style="background:#fcc;"
| 49
| January 26
| Phoenix
|  
| Jordan Clarkson (26)
| Hassan Whiteside (11)
| Mike Conley (10)
| Vivint Arena18,306
| 30–19
|-style="background:#fcc;"
| 50
| January 28
| @ Memphis
|  
| Danuel House (21)
| Hassan Whiteside (8)
| Mike Conley (6)
| FedEx Forum16,916
| 30–20
|-style="background:#fcc;"
| 51
| January 30
| @ Minnesota
|  
| Bojan Bogdanović (23)
| Hassan Whiteside (12)
| Clarkson, Conley (5)
| Target Center10,407
| 30–21

|-style="background:#cfc;"
| 52
| February 2
| Denver
| 
| Trent Forrest (18)
| Udoka Azubuike (10)
| Trent Forrest (8)
| Vivint Arena18,306
| 31–21
|-style="background:#cfc;"
| 53
| February 4
| Brooklyn
| 
| Donovan Mitchell (27)
| Azubuike, Bogdanović (11)
| Trent Forrest (7)
| Vivint Arena18,306
| 32–21
|-style="background:#cfc;"
| 54
| February 7
| New York
| 
| Donovan Mitchell (32)
| Udoka Azubuike (14)
| Mike Conley (7)
| Vivint Arena18,306
| 33–21
|-style="background:#cfc;"
| 55
| February 9
| Golden State
| 
| Bojan Bogdanović (23)
| Hassan Whiteside (17)
| Donovan Mitchell (8)
| Vivint Arena18,306
| 34–21
|-style="background:#cfc;"
| 56
| February 11
| Orlando
| 
| Donovan Mitchell (24) 
| Hassan Whiteside (18)
| Conley, O'Neale (5)
| Vivint Arena18,306
| 35–21 
|-style="background:#cfc;"
| 57
| February 14
| Houston
| 
| Donovan Mitchell (30)
| Hassan Whiteside (14) 
| Mike Conley (10)
| Vivint Arena18,306
| 36–21
|-style="background:#fcc;"
| 58
| February 16
| @ L.A. Lakers
|  
| Donovan Mitchell (37)
| Rudy Gobert (11)
| Conley, Mitchell (5)
| Staples Center17,787
| 36–22
|-style="background:#cfc;"
| 59
| February 25
| Dallas
|  
| Donovan Mitchell (33)
| Rudy Gobert (17)
| Conley, Mitchell (5)
| Vivint Arena18,306
| 37–22
|-style="background:#cfc;"
| 60
| February 27
| @ Phoenix
| 
| Donovan Mitchell (26)
| Rudy Gobert (14)
| Donovan Mitchell (5)
| Footprint Center17,071
| 38–22

|-style="background:#cfc;"
| 61
| March 2
| @ Houston
| 
| Donovan Mitchell (37) 
| Rudy Gobert (17)
| Donovan Mitchell (10)
| Toyota Center13,583
| 39–22
|-style="background:#fcc;"
| 62
| March 4
| @ New Orleans
|  
| Donovan Mitchell (14)
| Hassan Whiteside (12)
| Jordan Clarkson (4)
| Smoothie King Center16,178
| 39–23
|-style="background:#cfc;"
| 63
| March 6
| @ Oklahoma City
| 
| Bojan Bogdanović (35)
| Rudy Gobert (17)
| Donovan Mitchell (10)
| Paycom Center15,079
| 40–23
|-style="background:#fcc;"
| 64
| March 7
| @ Dallas
| 
| Bojan Bogdanović (21)
| Rudy Gobert (13)
| Donovan Mitchell (9)
| American Airlines Center20,077
| 40–24
|-style="background:#cfc;"
| 65
| March 9
| Portland
| 
| Bojan Bogdanović (27)
| Gobert, O'Neale (10)
| Donovan Mitchell (6)
| Vivint Arena18,306
| 41–24
|-style="background:#fcc;"
| 66
| March 11
| @ San Antonio
| 
| Donovan Mitchell (24)
| Rudy Gobert (16)
| Donovan Mitchell (6)
| AT&T Center15,753
| 41–25
|-style="background:#cfc;"
| 67
| March 12
| Sacramento
| 
| Jordan Clarkson (45)
| Hassan Whiteside (21)
| Donovan Mitchell (6)
| Vivint Arena18,306
| 42–25
|-style="background:#fcc;"
| 68
| March 14
| Milwaukee
| 
| Conley, Michell (29)
| Rudy Gobert (14)
| Donovan Mitchell (8)
| Vivint Arena18,306
| 42–26
|-style="background:#cfc;"
| 69
| March 16
| Chicago
| 
| Donovan Mitchell (37)
| Rudy Gobert (20)
| Mike Conley (7)
| Vivint Arena18,306
| 43–26
|-style="background:#cfc;"
| 70
| March 18
| L.A. Clippers
| 
| Jared Butler (21)
| Rudy Gobert (16)
| Jared Butler (7)
| Vivint Arena18,306
| 44–26
|-style="background:#cfc;"
| 71
| March 20
| @ New York
|  
| Donovan Mitchell (36)
| Rudy Gobert (9)
| Donovan Mitchell (6) 
| Madison Square Garden19,812
| 45–26
|-style="background:#fcc;"
| 72
| March 21
| @ Brooklyn
|  
| Donovan Mitchell (30) 
| Royce O'Neale (8)
| Mike Conley (7)
| Barclays Center17,887
| 45–27
|-style="background:#fcc;"
| 73
| March 23
| @ Boston
|  
| Donovan Mitchell (37) 
| Rudy Gobert (11)
| Mike Conley (3)
| TD GardenN/A
| 45–28
|-style="background:#fcc;"
| 74
| March 25
| @ Charlotte
| 
| Donovan Mitchell (26)  
| Rudy Gobert (19)
| Donovan Mitchell (7)  
| Spectrum Center19,162
| 45–29
|-style="background:#fcc;"
| 75
| March 27
| @ Dallas
| 
| Rudy Gay (18)
| Juancho Hernangómez (9)
| Mike Conley (7)
| American Airlines Center20,177
| 45–30
|-style="background:#fcc;"
| 76
| March 29
| @ L.A. Clippers
| 
| Donovan Mitchell (33)
| Rudy Gobert (16)
| Donovan Mitchell (6)
| Staples Center19,068
| 45–31
|-style="background:#cfc;"
| 77
| March 31
| L.A. Lakers
| 
| Donovan Mitchell (29)
| Rudy Gobert (17)
| Donovan Mitchell (7)
| Staples Center18,306
| 46–31

|-style="background:#fcc;"
| 78
| April 2
| @ Golden State
| 
| Conley, Mitchell (26)
| Rudy Gobert (20)
| Mike Conley (8)
| Chase Center18,064
| 46–32
|-style="background:#cfc;"
| 79
| April 5
| Memphis
| 
| Clarkson, Gobert (22)
| Rudy Gobert (21)
| Mike Conley (8)
| Vivint Arena18,306
| 47–32
|-style="background:#cfc;"
| 80
| April 6
| Oklahoma City
| 
| Bojan Bogdanović (27)
| Hassan Whiteside (11)
| Butler, Clarkson (10)
| Vivint Arena18,306
| 48–32
|-style="background:#fcc;"
| 81
| April 8
| Phoenix
| 
| Bojan Bogdanović (21)
| Rudy Gobert (12)
| Mike Conley (8)
| Vivint Arena18,306
| 48–33
|-style="background:#cfc;"
| 82
| April 10
| @ Portland
| 
| Juan Hernangómez (22)
| Rudy Gobert (13)
| Mike Conley (5)
| Moda Center18,123
| 49–33

Playoffs 

|-style="background:#cfc;"
| 1
| April 16
| @ Dallas
| 
| Donovan Mitchell (32)
| Rudy Gobert (17)
| Donovan Mitchell (6)
| American Airlines Center20,013
| 1–0
|-style="background:#fcc;"
| 2
| April 18
| @ Dallas
| 
| Donovan Mitchell (34)
| Rudy Gobert (17)
| Donovan Mitchell (5)
| American Airlines Center20,113
| 1–1
|-style="background:#fcc;"
| 3
| April 21
| Dallas
| 
| Donovan Mitchell (32)
| Rudy Gobert (7)
| Conley Jr., Mitchell 6
| Vivint Arena18,306
| 1–2
|-style="background:#cfc;"
| 4
| April 23
| Dallas
| 
| Jordan Clarkson (25)
| Rudy Gobert (15)
| Donovan Mitchell (7)
| Vivint Arena18,306
| 2-2
|-style="background:#fcc;"
| 5
| April 25
| @ Dallas
| 
| Jordan Clarkson (20)
| Rudy Gobert (11)
| Mike Conley Jr. (5)
| American Airlines Center20,577
| 2–3
|-style="background:#fcc;"
| 6
| April 28
| Dallas
| 
| Donovan Mitchell (39)
| Rudy Gobert (12)
| Donovan Mitchell (9)
| Vivint Arena18,306
| 2–4

Transactions

Trades

Free agency

Re-signed

Additions

Subtractions

Notes

References

Utah Jazz seasons
Utah
Utah Jazz
Utah Jazz